The 2014–15 Bangalore Super Division was the twelfth season of the Bangalore Super Division which is the third tier of the Indian football system and the top tier of the Karnataka football system. ASC won the championship. It was their first title.

Teams

Results

References

Bangalore Super Division seasons
4